In Bangladesh, dental school are well known as dental colleges. Like medical education, dental education are conducted by different dental colleges located all over the country. These dental colleges are affiliated with medical faculties of different government-funded public universities. These dental colleges conduct a graduate course known as Bachelor of Dental Surgery (BDS). Each dental college is affiliated with a specific medical faculty of a university. The university conducts and monitors their professional examination, education system, syllabus, academic activity and finally awarded the Bachelor of Dental Surgery (BDS) degree. The dental college students also have to do an internship training program in these dental colleges to get the practicing permission in the country. After successfully finishing the internship training in any of the dental colleges, final dental practicing license or registration certificate is awarded by Bangladesh Medical and Dental Council. Bangladesh Medical and Dental Council also acts as a motoring and regulatory body to monitor, assess, evaluate, and permit the practice license of these dental schools graduate along with respective university.

The four universities that have dentistry in their medical faculties are The University of Dhaka, The University of Chittagong and the University of Rajshahi & SUST. These four public universities have their medical faculties affiliated with dental colleges and hospitals; those may be publicly or privately funded.

Public dental colleges

Private dental colleges

See also
 List of medical schools in Bangladesh
Bangladesh Medical and Dental Council

References

External links
 List of affiliated dental colleges with University of Dhaka
 Affiliated Colleges & Institutions with University of Rajshahi
 Affiliated Colleges with University of Chittagong

Dental schools
Bangladesh
Bangladesh, Dental schools
Dental schools